Mirepoix is a traditional French culinary combination of onions, carrots and celery aromatics.

Mirepoix may also refer to:

 Mirepoix, Ariège, a commune in France
 Mirepoix Cathedral
 Mirepoix, Gers, a commune in France
 Mirepoix-sur-Tarn, a commune in the Haute-Garonne département